The Asociación de los Escritores en Lenguas Indígenas is a Mexican arts organization centered on writers in indigenous languages.

It was founded by Natalio Hernández.

Languages of Mexico
Arts organizations based in Mexico